Susana Olaondo (born 27 May 1953) is a Uruguayan writer and illustrator.

Biography
Susana Olaondo was born in Montevideo in 1953. She studied drawing, painting, photography, sculpture, and introduction to visual and technical language in gardening, and graduated from the Municipal School of Gardening. Since 1990 she has held a plastic expression workshop for children where creativity is encouraged. The author highlights her versatility by writing her own stories and illustrating them. She initially started writing and drawing for her two children. In 1990 she illustrated her first book, La Tía Merelde, and since then has continued to work in children's literature. Several of her books have been published and translated in the United States and Chile. She has published several works, including an audiobook for the Braille Foundation of Uruguay.

The author has demonstrated her passion for nature, plants and animals, taking these elements as inspiration to reflect on later in her books. Some of her stories (Felipe, Olegario, Una Pindó) have been theatrically adapted.

Awards and recognitions
 1997, 2nd National Literature Prize for children and young adults for Felipe 
 1998, 1st National Literature Prize for children and young adults for Un cuento de papel
 2000, Honorable mention for Apenas un color from the Ministry of Education and Culture of Uruguay (MEC)
 2002, Honorable mention for Uno de conejos from the MEC
 2004, 1st mention for Una Pindó from the MEC
 2006, 2nd National Literature Prize for children and young adults for Palabras (shared with writer )
 2008, Honorable mention for Gato negro, gato blanco from the MEC
 2010, Bartolomé Hidalgo Prize for Por un color, "for encouraging reading in images, where text and illustration coexist, and the ethical and aesthetic function of Children's and Young People's Literature are combined"
 2016, Golden Book Award for Los patos que no tiene ombligo

Works

References

External links

 

1953 births
20th-century Uruguayan women writers
Uruguayan children's book illustrators
Living people
Uruguayan children's writers
Uruguayan women children's writers
Uruguayan women illustrators
Writers from Montevideo
Premio Bartolomé Hidalgo